Radio Video is an EP by Royal Trux.  It was released as a one-sided twelve-inch and CD in 2000 by Drag City.

Track listing
All songs written by Neil Hagerty and Jennifer Herrema
"The Inside Game" – 3:42
"Victory Chimp: Episode 3" – 4:37
"Dirty Headlines" – 3:27
"Mexican Comet" – 1:37
"On My Mind" – 3:24

References

Royal Trux albums
2000 EPs
Drag City (record label) EPs
Domino Recording Company EPs